Night Call(s) or Nightcall may refer to:

Music
 Night Call (album), by Years & Years, or the title song, 2022
 Night Calls (album), by Joe Cocker, or the title song, 1991
 "Nightcall" (song), by Kavinsky, 2010; covered by London Grammar, 2013
 "Night Call", a song by Steve Aoki from Steve Aoki Presents Kolony, 2017

Other uses
 Night Call (podcast), a 2018–2020 weekly call-in program
 Night Call (video game), a 2019 adventure game
 "Night Call" (The Twilight Zone), a 1964 TV episode
 Night Calls (TV series), a 1995–2007 Playboy TV program